Shandi Mitchell is a Canadian novelist and filmmaker. Her first novel Under This Unbroken Sky won a 2010 Commonwealth Writers' Prize and other awards. She graduated from Dalhousie University.

Her newest novel, The Waiting Hours, is slated for publication in 2019.

Awards and honors
2012: Kobzar Literary Award, Under This Unbroken Sky
2010: Commonwealth Writers' Prize (first novel, Canada and the Caribbean), Under This Unbroken Sky
2010: Thomas Head Raddall Award, Under This Unbroken Sky
2008: Victor Martin-Lynch Staunton Endowment in Media Arts, Canada Council

Works
Literary
2011 - Under This Unbroken Sky
2019 - The Waiting Hours

Film
2002 Baba's House (short) 
2005 Tell Me (short) 
2012 The Disappeared

References

External links
Official website

Canadian women novelists
Living people
Dalhousie University alumni
21st-century Canadian novelists
Year of birth missing (living people)